Pietà or Lamentation over the Dead Christ is a fragment of a lunette fresco of  by Bramantino, originally over the door of the church of San Sepolcro in Milan and now in the Pinacoteca Ambrosiana in the same city.

The painting depicts the dead Christ held up by the Virgin Mary, with John the Evangelist and Mary Magdalene holding up his arms. To the left are Anthony the Great and another standing figure, whilst in the background is a perspective view suggestive of a basilica nave.

References

1470s paintings
1500 paintings
Paintings by Bramantino
Paintings in the collection of the Pinacoteca Ambrosiana
Paintings of the Pietà
Paintings of Anthony the Great
Paintings depicting John the Apostle
Paintings depicting Mary Magdalene
Fresco paintings in Milan